Justice Starr may refer to:

Oliver Starr (1883–1961), associate justice of the Supreme Court of Indiana
Raymond Wesley Starr (1888–1968), associate justice of the Michigan Supreme Court

See also
Judge Starr (disambiguation)